The Vanil d'Arpille (also known as Maischüpfenspitz) is a mountain of the Swiss Prealps, located north of Im Fang in the canton of Fribourg.

References

External links
Vanil d'Arpille on Hikr.org

Mountains of the Alps
Mountains of Switzerland
Mountains of the canton of Fribourg
Two-thousanders of Switzerland